"Longtime" is a song by Australian blues musician Ash Grunwald. The song was release in April 2012 as the lead single from Grunwald's sixth studio album, Trouble's Door.

At the APRA Music Awards of 2013, "Longtime" won "Blues & Roots Work of the Year"

Music video
The music video for "Longtime" was released on 25 April 2012.

The clip was filmed in two days at The Pass and at Broken Head, NSW and features a number of surfing musicians including Pete Murray, Xavier Rudd, Kram (Spiderbait), Scotty Owen (The Living End), Bob McTavish, Fingers Malone, Derek Hynde, Beau Young and Dave Rastovich surfing in the clip.

Reception
In an album review, Andrew Nock from Music Feeds said "First single off the album 'Longtime' is a killer track, with a guitar hook so catchy and infectious, it's impossible not to feel incredibly happy and upbeat stomping your foot and grooving out to it. Such a funky sound resonates through the song by incorporating many guitar loops, with varying effects and multiple percussive elements." adding "The vocal distortion in the chorus between powerful lyric, 'Thought I was high but I was barely alive', makes it difficult to distinguish between Ash's hummed voice and guitar, inadvertently creating an incredibly infectious hook".

References

2012 singles
APRA Award winners